Major General Bhuwan Chandra Khanduri (Retd.),  AVSM, (born 1 October 1934) is an Indian politician. He was Chief Minister of Uttarakhand from 2007 to 2009 and 2011 to 2012. He was a Member of Parliament in the 16th Lok Sabha representing the Garhwal parliamentary constituency of Uttarakhand and is a senior member of the Bharatiya Janta Party. Earlier, he was a cabinet minister, Ministry of Surface Transport of the government headed by the former Prime Minister of India, Atal Bihari Vajpayee.

Family and personal life
Khanduri was born at Dehradun in 1934. His parents were Jai Ballabh Khanduri (father), a journalist, and Durga Devi Khanduri (mother), a social activist. Khanduri is married to Aruna Khanduri (née Nailwal). He has a son Manish Khanduri and daughter Ritu Khanduri.

Educational profile
Khanduri is B.Sc., B.E. and M.I.E. (India). He is also a post-graduate in defence management. He studied at College of Military Engineering, Pune, Allahabad University, Institute of Engineers, New Delhi, and Institute of Defence Management, Secunderabad.

Army career
Khanduri served in Corps of Engineers, Indian Army, from 1954 to 1991. Positions held in the army include:

 Commander of Regiment (during the Indo-Pakistan War in 1971)
 Chief Engineer in the Army
 Commander of an Engineering Brigade
 Additional Military Secretary at Army Headquarters
 Additional Director General in the Engineer-in-Chief's division at the Army Headquarters

In 1983, he received the Ati Vishisht Seva Medal from the President of India for his extraordinary contribution to the Indian Army. He retired as a major general.

Political career
He had shown patriotism during the freedom struggle as a student and, thus, displayed a remarkable political consciousness even at an early age. Khanduri was first elected to Lok Sabha from Garhwal in Uttarakhand in 1991 and in subsequent elections. He was the Minister of State (with independent charge) of the Ministry of Road Transport and Highways from 2000 to 2003 in the Union government headed by Atal Bihari Vajpayee. He was elevated to cabinet rank in 2003, and held the post until the end of the tenure of the NDA government in May 2004. He is a senior leader of Bhartiya Janata Party, having served on various parliamentary committees. As a minister, he implemented BJP's National Highways Development project. At the Ministry of Road Transport and Highways, he executed the National Highways Development Plan of the NDA and gave shape to the Golden Quadrilateral Project connecting the major Indian cities and the North–South and East–West Corridor Project.

In February 2007, he led the BJP to victory in the assembly elections in Uttarakhand and was subsequently chosen to be the new Chief Minister of the state. Among Khanduri's first accomplishments as Chief Minister was to cut expenses by reducing his own security and that of politicians and administrative officials, cutting back on their allowance for foreign trips and restricting the use of the Chief Minister's discretionary fund to the projects approved by the district magistrates. Following his election, he toured the entire state to gain first hand information about the conditions of the people. On 11 September 2011, Khanduri announced the setting up of a stronger Lokayukta to check rampant corruption. The Uttarakhand Government approved the draft of the Lokayukta Bill, bringing within its ambit all the ministers, including the Chief Minister, the MLAs and the government servants including IAS and IPS officers, with a provision of life imprisonment or more severe punishment. The eco-friendly and sustainable industrial development of the state is, inter-alia, among the top priorities of Khanduri.

Political positions held 
  Member of Parliament from the Garhwal Lok Sabha Constituency in 10th, 12th, 13th, 14th and 16th Lok Sabha
  During 1992-1997: Member of the National Executive, Bhartiya Janata Party
  From 1992 to 1997: Vice President of the BJP State Unit of Uttar Pradesh
  During 12th and 13th Lok Sabha: Chief whip of Bhartiya Janata Party in the Parliament
  1998 – 99: Member of various parliamentary committees (Committee on Public Accounts, Rules Committee, Business Advisory Committee, and Committee on Home Affairs)
  During 1999: Member of the Consultative Committee, Ministry of Defence,  Member of the Committee on Public Undertakings
  During 2000-2001: Member of the Committee on Ethics; Consultative Committee, Ministry of Petroleum and Natural Gas
 7 November 2000: Union Minister of State (Independent Charge), Ministry of Road Transport and Highways
 During 2000–2003: Member of National Executive, Bhartiya Janata Party
 During 2007-2009: He served as the 4th Chief Minister of Uttarakhand
 2011 -2012: Chief Minister of Uttarakhand
 6 March 2012 B C Khanduri lost the election from constituency Kotdwar, Uttrakhand
 16 May 2014: Won the Garhwal constituency  by a margin of 1,84,526 votes

He also represented Departments of Personnel, Public Grievances and Pensions, and Law and Company Affairs, and was a convener of the Subcommittee on Personnel Policy of Central Paramilitary Forces (CPMFs) under different capacities.

Public image
Khanduri has always been perceived as a man of integrity and honesty. While he presided over the state government of Uttarakhand he pushed for the implementation of a strong Lokayukta bill (public ombudsman), citizen charter and a transparent transfer policy for state employers. The passage of the Lokayukta earned Khanduri praise from Anna Hazare, who urged the Union government and other state governments to follow suit. The bill, however, has not been accepted by the Union of India. Presidential approval was given on 17 October 2013.

Social activities
Khanduri has overseen the activities of the Chandra Ballabh Trust, an educational trust in Garhwal initiated by his grandfather in 1917. He is also associated with other organisations in various capacities including Purva Sainik Seva Parishad (Uttar Pradesh), Parvatiya Sanskriti Parishad in Dehradun, Govind Ballabh Pant Himalaya Environment and Development Committee and the Wild Life Society of India

He was also the chairperson of the Uttaranchal Pradesh Sangarsh Samiti.

2012 Uttarakhand Assembly elections
On 6 March 2012, BJP lost the majority in Uttarakhand winning 31 seats out of 70. Khanduri too lost his election from Kotdwara constituency and tendered his resignation to the governor of Uttarakhand on 7 March 2012.

See also
 B. C. Khanduri ministry (2011–12)

References

http://cm.uk.gov.in/
http://uk.gov.in/

External links 
http://www.indianexpress.com/news/development-work-will-not-be-stopped-khanduri/845322/
http://www.rediff.com/news/2003/jan/25buzz.htm
https://web.archive.org/web/20060520221718/http://164.100.24.208/ls/lsmember/biodatap13.asp?mpsno=196
Khanduri to be named Uttarakhand CM 
https://web.archive.org/web/20120205052240/http://www.businessworld.in/businessworld/businessworld/bw/BC-Khanduri
https://web.archive.org/web/20131213144203/http://news.outlookindia.com/items.aspx?artid=813876

|-

|-

|-

|-

|-

1934 births
Living people
Chief ministers from Bharatiya Janata Party
Indian generals
India MPs 2004–2009
University of Allahabad alumni
Politicians from Dehradun
Chief Ministers of Uttarakhand
Members of the Uttarakhand Legislative Assembly
Military personnel from Uttarakhand
Uttarakhand MLAs 2007–2012
Lok Sabha members from Uttarakhand
India MPs 1991–1996
India MPs 1998–1999
India MPs 1999–2004
India MPs 2014–2019
Bharatiya Janata Party politicians from Uttarakhand
People from Pauri Garhwal district
Finance Ministers of Uttarakhand